North Vancouver—Burnaby  was a federal electoral district in British Columbia, Canada, that was represented in the House of Commons of Canada from 1979 to 1988.

This riding was created in 1976 from parts of Burnaby—Seymour and Capilano ridings.

It was abolished in 1987 when it was redistributed into Burnaby—Kingsway and North Vancouver ridings.

Members of Parliament

Election results

See also 

 List of Canadian federal electoral districts
 Past Canadian electoral districts

External links 
Riding history from the Library of Parliament

Former federal electoral districts of British Columbia